Klaus Wilhelm Roggenkamp (24 December 1940 – 23 July 2021) was a German mathematician, specializing in algebra.

Education and career
As an undergraduate, Roggenkamp studied mathematics from 1960 to 1964 at the University of Giessen. There in 1967 he received his PhD. His thesis Darstellungen endlicher Gruppen in Polynombereichen (Representations of finite groups in polynomial integral domains) was written under the supervision of Hermann Boerner. As a postdoc Roggenkamp was at the University of Illinois at Urbana-Champaign, where he studied under Irving Reiner, and at the University of Montreal. After four years as a professor at Bielefeld University, he was appointed to the chair of algebra at the University of Stuttgart.

Roggenkamp and Leonard Lewy Scott collaborated on a long series of papers on the groups of units of integral group rings, dealing with problems connected with the "integral isomorphism problem", which was proposed by Graham Higman in his 1940 doctoral dissertation at the University of Oxford. In 1986 Roggenkamp and Scott proved their most famous theorem (published in 1987 in the Annals of Mathematics). Their 1987 paper also established a very strong form of a conjecture made by Hans Zassenhaus. The papers of Roggenkamp and Scott were the basis for most developments which followed in the study of finite groups of units of integral group rings.

In 1988 Roggenkamp and Scott found a counterexample to another conjecture by Hans Zassenhaus — the conjecture was a somewhat strengthened form of the conjecture that the "integral isomorphism problem" always has an affirmative solution. Martin Hertweck, partly building on the techniques introduced by Roggenkamp and Scott for their counterexample, published a counterexample to the conjecture that the "integral isomorphism problem" can always be solved affirmatively.

Roggenkamp was elected a member of the Akademie gemeinnütziger Wissenschaften zu Erfurt (Erfurt Academy of Useful Sciences) and was made an honorary member of Ovidius University of Constanța in Romania.

Selected publications

Articles

Books
 
  (reprint of 1970 1st edition)
  (2014 reprint)
  (reprint of 1979 original )
 
  (reprint of 1992 original )

as editor
  book table of contents at Springer website
  (reprint of 1985 1st edition)

References

1940 births
2021 deaths
Group theorists
20th-century German mathematicians
21st-century German mathematicians
University of Giessen alumni
Academic staff of Bielefeld University
Academic staff of the University of Stuttgart
People from Hanover